C.I.P.C.E. is the international piano competition celebrating Spanish composers (in Spanish: Concurso Internacional de Piano Compositores de España), which is held each year around November in the auditorium “Joaquín Rodrigo” of Las Rozas de Madrid with an international jury of renowned musicians.

Each year a different Spanish composer is honored, allowing the public the opportunity of enjoying a range of piano works.

CIPCE is a member of the World Federation of International Music Competitions since the year 2022. Competitors who have achieved an appropriate standard set by the federation may pass directly to the second stage of the competition.

Composers honoured
 2000 Antón García Abril
 2001 Xavier Montsalvatge
 2002 Tomás Marco
 2003  Carlos Cruz de Castro
 2004 Joaquín Rodrigo
 2005 Zulema de La Cruz
 2006 Gabriel Fernández Álvez
 2007 Claudio Prieto
 2008 Cristóbal Halffter
 2009 Joaquín Turina
 2010 José Zárate
 2011 Salvador Brotons
 2012 Isaac Albéniz
 2013 Antón García Abril
 2014 Miguel Ángel Gómez Martínez
 2015 
 2016 Alejandro Román
 2017 Juan Manuel Ruiz
 2018 José Luis Turina
 2019 Juan Durán
 2021 Pascual Gimeno
 2022 Enrique Granados

Prize Winners

References
English version of the webpage of The Concurso Internacional de Piano Compositores de España(C.I.P.C.E.)

Music competitions in Spain